WEHS may refer to:

 WEHS-LP, a low-power radio station (101.7 FM) licensed to serve Eupora, Mississippi, United States
 WXFT-DT, a television station serving Chicago, Illinois, United States, broadcasting as WEHS between 1987 and 2001
 Wausau East High School, Wausau, Wisconsin, United States
 Weslaco East High School, Welasco, Texas, United States
 West Essex High School, North Caldwell, New Jersey, United States
 Wylie East High School, Wylie, Texas, United States
 Wyoming East High School, New Richmond, West Virginia, United States